A neutron supermirror is a highly polished, layered material used to reflect neutron beams. Supermirrors are a special case of multi-layer neutron reflectors with varying layer thicknesses.

Supermirrors are produced by depositing alternating layers of strongly contrasting substances, such as nickel and titanium, on a smooth substrate.  A single layer of high refractive index material (e.g. nickel) exhibits total external reflection at small grazing angles up to a critical angle .  For nickel with natural isotopic abundances,  in degrees is approximately  where  is the neutron wavelength in Angstrom units.

A mirror with a larger effective critical angle can be made by exploiting diffraction (with non-zero losses) that occurs from stacked multilayers.

Nickel has a positive scattering cross section, and titanium has a negative scattering cross section, and in both elements the absorption cross section is small, which makes Ni-Ti the most efficient technology with neutrons. This has a strong bearing on the economic strategy of neutron instrument design.

References

Optical materials